N1000, N-1000, N.1000, N 1000 may represent:

 Keikyu N1000 series, a train type in Japan
 Nagoya Municipal Subway N1000 series, a train type in Japan
 PSP-N1000 PlayStation Portable, see PSP Go
 N1000, a series in the Compaq Evo product line
 N1000, a 1 MW two-bladed wind turbine produced by Nordic Windpower